Ella the Elephant is a Canadian animated television preschool series based on the books by Carmela D' Amico & Steven Henry (né D'Amico). The series was produced by DHX Cookie Jar Inc. (owned by WildBrain), in association with TVOKids and FremantleMedia Kids and Family Entertainment, with animation provided by Atomic Cartoons, with the series' funding provided by The Canadian Film or Video Production Tax Credit and The Ontario Film and Television Tax Credit. The series' completion guarantee was provided by Film Finances Canada Ltd.

The series follows the adventures of Ella (voiced by Addison Holley) and her friends on Elephant Island. Ella is a spirited anthropomorphic little girl elephant with a big heart, bigger imagination and a magic hat that can transform into almost anything. Every day, there's a fantastic new adventure as Ella and her friends, Frankie (voiced by Devan Cohen), Belinda (voiced by Annick Obonsawin) and Tiki (voiced by Avery Kadish), get themselves into some tricky situations. With a little determination, teamwork, a few missteps, and a touch of magic, Ella and her friends work to make everything work out in the end.

The first season of Ella the Elephant aired on TVOKids in Canada from September 2, 2013 to January 23, 2014. The first season of the series also aired on Knowledge Kids and Télé-Québec in Canada. The first season of Ella the Elephant aired on Disney Channel/Disney Junior in the United States from February 17, 2014 to December 13, 2014.

It also aired on Tiny Pop, Canal Panda, Doordarshan, ABC Kids and Hop! Channel.

Premise
The series follows the adventures of Ella and her friends on Elephant Island. Ella is a spirited little girl elephant with a big heart, bigger imagination and a magic hat that can transform into almost anything. Every day, there's a fantastic new adventure as Ella and her friends, Frankie, Belinda and Tiki, get themselves into some tricky situations. With a little determination, teamwork, a few missteps, and a touch of magic, Ella and her friends work to make everything work out in the end.

Production
The series was produced by DHX Cookie Jar Inc. for TVOKids and Disney Junior, with animation provided by Atomic Cartoons, and distributed by FremantleMedia Kids & Family Entertainment. The series' funding provided by The Canadian Film or Video Production Tax Credit and The Ontario Film and Television Tax Credit, with the completion guarantee provided by Film Finances Canada Ltd. Carmela D' Amico & Steven D' Amico are the adapters of the series, while Larry Jacobs is the director. Executive producers includes Michael Hirsh, Toper Taylor, and John Vandervelde for DHX Cookie Jar Inc., Sander Schwartz and Alyssa Cooper Sapire for FremantleMedia Kids & Family Entertainment and Patricia Ellingson for TVOKids. Other staff for the series includes Jonah Stroh as producer and Brad Birch as executive story editor.

Development for the series started in 2012.

On February 7, 2012, Chris Arrant, news editor of Cartoon Brew, announced that the series entered production. Toper Taylor, president and COO of Cookie Jar was pleasantly thrilled for the production of Ella the Elephant and said: "Ella is a magical property about an ever ebullient, optimistic, responsible, compassionate little elephant whose kindred spirit will delight our preschool audience." "We are thrilled to be working with both Disney and Fremantle on the series' global launch."

Sander Schwartz, President, Kids & Family Entertainment, FME, said "We are very pleased to be partnered with Cookie Jar on what we believe will be a hugely successful series. Bringing these wonderful books to life is a labour of love for everyone working on this stunning series".

Characters

Main
Ella (voiced by Addison Holley) is the main character and a young elephant with a red magic hat that her grandma gave to her. Ella is a problem-solver who is nice and kind to all her friends. Her magic hat transforms into different items depending on what she needs it for.
Belinda (voiced by Annick Obonsawin) is an elephant who is lucky enough to have Elephant Island's mayor for her father, as well as a friend to Ella. Belinda loves to dance and is a total diva.
Tiki (voiced by Avery Kadish) is a smart female elephant who loves reading books and riding her bike. She has a pet monkey named Lola.
Frankie (voiced by Devan Cohen) is a friend of Ella's who is a young elephant as well and is the only male of the group. Frankie's catchphrase is "Great Wolly Mammoth!"

Recurring
Lola (voiced by Rob Tinkler) is a pet monkey who is owned by Tiki.
Mrs. Briggs (voiced by Helen Taylor) is Ella, Belinda, Frankie, Tiki, Ada, and Ida's teacher who likes interpretive dancing.
Ada and Ida (voiced by Sophia Ewaniuk) are twin elephants who sometimes say things at the same time. When they do, they high-five and say "Jinx!" followed by a giggle. Ada and Ida are a little hard to tell apart, but they both love to sing.
Captain Kelp (voiced by Neil Crone) is an elephant who works in a lighthouse.
Mrs. Grey (voiced by Stacey DePass) is Ella's mother, who is a baker.
Captain Shamus Grey (also voiced by Neil Crone) is Ella's father who is captain of the sea.
Mrs. Harriet Melba (voiced by Shoshana Sperling) is Frankie's mother, who owns a bakery.
Mr. Mercer (voiced by Phil Williams) is an elephant who sells many items. Ella and her friends visit him often. He is sometimes grumpy.
Georgie (voiced by Jaxon Mercey) is a little elephant who is Frankie's little brother.
Mayor Jeremiah Blue (voiced by Danny Wells) is an elephant who is Belinda's father. The mayor of Elephant Island.
Grandma Grey (voiced by Catherine Disher) is an elephant who is Ella's grandma and the original owner of the magic hat. She appeared in the episode "Grandma's Visit".
Old Lady (voiced by Julie Lemieux) is a lady elephant with an unknown name who appeared in the episode "Hello Dolly", where Frankie accidentally sold Ella's doll to the lady.
Jasper (also voiced by Julie Lemieux) is a little mouse who causes trouble with Ella and her friends.
E.L. Weathers (voiced by Alyson Court) is an elephant who writes books. She appeared in the episode "Tiki's Quest".
Mrs. Everheart (voiced by Helen King) is an elephant who is a librarian. She also appeared in the episode "Tiki's Quest".
Mrs. Potter (voiced by Susan Roman) is an elephant who carves pumpkins in Halloween time. She appeared in the episode "Frankie's Perfect Pumpkin".
Sammy (voiced by Peter DaCunha) is an elephant who does newspaper deliveries in Elephant Island. He appeared in the episode "Ella's Special Delivery".
Mikey (voiced by Gage Munroe) in an elephant who helps Sammy do newspaper deliveries. He also appeared in the episode "Ella's Special Delivery".
Caretaker (voiced by John Stocker) is an elephant who operates the museum. He appeared in the episode "Jurassic Sleepover".
Mayor's Assistant (voiced by Catherine Disher) is an elephant who helps Belinda's dad. She appeared in the episode "Mayor Belinda".
Mrs. Brim (voiced by Linda Ballantyne) is an elephant who works at a hat store. She appeared in the episode "Ella's Haywire Hat".
Max von Mastodon (voiced by Juan Chioran) is an elephant who is a famous filmmaker. He appeared in the episode "Lights, Camera, Ella".

Episodes

All episodes were directed by Larry Jacobs.

Distribution

Broadcast
Ella the Elephant premiered on TVOKids, Knowledge Kids and Télé-Québec in Canada on September 2, 2013. The series premiered on Disney Channel and Disney Junior in the United States on February 17, 2014. Other broadcasters includes Tiny Pop in the UK, ABC 4 Kids in Australia and RTÉjr in Ireland. Since June 23, 2014, Disney Junior (Latin America) started airing the show. TiJi (France), Clan (Spain), MiniMini+ (Poland), Minimax (Eastern and Central Europe), KiKA (Germany) and MTV3 Juniori (Finland) had recently acquired the show and will add it to their lineup in 2014.

Home media
Episodes of Ella the Elephant are available for digital download through the iTunes Music Store, which are split into two volumes. FremantleMedia Home Entertainment released a 154-minute Region 4 DVD of the show on August 6, 2014. In 2014, Warner Home Video has released Volume 1 on DVD for Canada and the US. As of February 28, 2015, the series became available for streaming on the American Netflix.

Toys and merchandising
DHX Media and FremantleMedia Kids & Family Entertainment have appointed Jazwares Inc. as the global master toy partner on preschool property Ella the Elephant for the US, Canada, UK, Ireland, Latin America, Middle East, Australia, Spain and Norway. The deal will enable Jazwares to launch worldwide Plush, Dolls Figures and Play Sets, Vehicles, Role Play and Musical Instruments, based on the animated preschool series about an adventurous elephant and her magic hat. In December 2014, it was announced that DHX Brands and Penguin Young Readers were developing a series of books based on the series, which were released in late 2015.

Critical reception
Common Sense Media rated the show 4 stars out of 5, with the review stating that "Strong messages of friendship and kindness are central to each story, and the young characters use their imaginations to solve the little troubles they and their neighbors face."

References

External links
Ella the Elephant at TVOKids.com
Ella the Elephant at DisneyJunior.com

2010s Canadian animated television series
2010s Canadian children's television series
2013 Canadian television series debuts
2014 Canadian television series endings
TVO original programming
Disney Channel original programming
Disney Junior original programming
Animated television series about elephants
Canadian children's animated adventure television series
Canadian children's animated fantasy television series
Canadian computer-animated television series
Canadian preschool education television series
Canadian television shows based on children's books
Television series by Cookie Jar Entertainment
Television series by FremantleMedia Kids & Family
English-language television shows
Animated television series about children
Animated preschool education television series
2010s preschool education television series
Television series by DHX Media